The Topolog is a left tributary of the river Olt in Romania. It discharges into the Olt (Băbeni Reservoir) in Ostroveni. It is formed by two source rivers that come from the southern slopes of the Făgăraș Mountains: Negoiu and Scara. It flows through the communes Sălătrucu, Șuici, Cepari, Tigveni, Ciofrângeni, Poienarii de Argeș, Milcoiu, Nicolae Bălcescu and Galicea. For much of its length it forms the border between the counties Argeș and Vâlcea.

Tributaries

The following rivers are tributaries to the river Topolog (from source to mouth):

Left: Negoiu, Izvorul Podeanului, Marginea, Cumpăna, Valea Plopilor, Valea Satului
Right: Scara, Mâzgavu, Izvorul Coastelor, Topologel, Cărpeniș, Bădislava, Ciutești, Șerbăneasa

References

Rivers of Romania
Rivers of Argeș County
Rivers of Vâlcea County